The Alytidae are a family of primitive frogs. Their common name is painted frogs or midwife toads. Most are endemic to Europe, but three species occur in northwest Africa, and a species formerly thought to be extinct is found in Israel.

This family is also known as Discoglossidae, but the older name Alytidae has priority and is now recognized by major reference works. Some researchers, though, suggest that Alytes and Discoglossus are different enough to be treated as belonging to separate families, implying resurrection of the Discoglossidae. The term "discoglossid" has also been used to refer to many primitive fossil frogs that share plesiomorphic (ancestral) similities to alytids, but that are probably not closely related.

Genera and species
The family contains three extant genera, Alytes, Discoglossus, and Latonia. The first is somewhat toad-like and can often be found on land. The second is smoother and more frog-like, preferring the water. The third genus was until recently considered extinct, and is represented by the recently rediscovered Hula painted frog. All of the species have pond-dwelling tadpoles.

The genera Bombina and Barbourula also used to be under this family, but have now been moved to the Bombinatoridae.

Extant genera

Extinct genera
Family Alytidae
 Genus †Enneabatrachus (prehistoric)
 †Enneabatrachus hechti
 Genus †Aralobatrachus (prehistoric)
 †Aralobatrachus robustus
 Genus †Callobatrachus (prehistoric)
 †Callobatrachus sanyanensis
 Genus †Bakonybatrachus (prehistoric)
 †Bakonybatrachus fedori
 Genus †Eodiscoglossus (prehistoric)
 †Eodiscoglossus oxoniensis
 †Eodiscoglossus santonjae

References

External links

Archaeobatrachia

Extant Late Jurassic first appearances
Taxa named by Leopold Fitzinger
Amphibian families
Palearctic fauna